The 1951 Glitfaxi air crash (Icelandic: Glitfaxaslysið, "the Glitfaxi accident") was a plane crash that occurred on 31 January 1951 when a Douglas DC-3 from Flugfélag Íslands, christened Glitfaxi, crashed in Faxaflói in Iceland, killing all 20 people aboard. It remains the second deadliest air crash in Iceland behind the 1947 Héðinsfjörður air crash.

The plane was attempting to land at Reykjavík airport during heavy snowfall. Its first attempt to land was aborted due to low visibility. During its second attempt, all contact was lost with the plane. After it became clear that Glitfaxi had disappeared, a search immediately began. The following days, both land, sea and air searches were conducted including by the ICGV Ægir and the herring vessel Fanney that searched the area with depth sounders. While several items belonging to the plane where found in the ocean, the wreck itself was never officially found.

Aircraft
Glitfaxi was built in 1942 in Santa Monica, California, for the United States Air Force. In November 1946, Flugfélag Íslands bought the aircraft from Scottish Aviation which had converted her for passenger flights.

Aftermath
The crash hit the small town of Vestmannaeyjar hard, where the majority of the passengers where from, leaving 50 children in the town without a father.

In popular culture
The accident is featured in the book Hinn hvíti galdur by Ólafur Tryggvason.

References

1951 in Iceland
Icelandic
Aviation accidents and incidents in Iceland